Dovillers-Manning-Magoffin House, also known as the McKay House, is a historic home located at Columbia, South Carolina. It was built in 1856, and is a -story clapboard Greek Revival style cottage. It sits on a raised basement. The front facade features a one-story portico supported by four piers. It was the home of Eugene Dovilliers, an artist; the Manning family; and Dr. Ralph Deman Magoffin, a noted classical archaeologist. The house was moved to its present site in 1964.

It was added to the National Register of Historic Places in 1979.

References

Houses on the National Register of Historic Places in South Carolina
Greek Revival houses in South Carolina
Houses completed in 1856
Houses in Columbia, South Carolina
National Register of Historic Places in Columbia, South Carolina